Härnösand is a locality and the seat of Härnösand Municipality in Västernorrland County, Sweden with 25,012 inhabitants in 2023.  It is called "the gate to the High Coast" because of the world heritage landscape just a few miles north of Härnösand. Härnösand is the seat of the Diocese of Härnösand as well as of Västernorrland County Museum.

History 

On 10 December 1885, Härnösand became the first town in Sweden with electric street lighting, following the Gådeå power station being taken into use.

Education 
Härnösand is the seat of The National Agency for Special Needs Education and Schools (Specialpedagogiska skolmyndigheten). 

The Swedish International Development Cooperation Agency (Sida) operates its training programme Sida Partnership Forum in Härnösand.

Industry 
One of the biggest employers in Härnösand is the cable-TV and Cable internet service provider Com Hem.

Sports
The women's team of the bandy club Härnösands AIK plays in the highest division and the men's team has done.

Their handballteam plays in division 2 and is called Brännans IF.

The football club IF Älgarna plays in Division 2  Norrland.

Curling has also been a successful sport in the city, Team Anette Norberg is from here. Anette has taken several medals in the sport, including Olympic gold. It is perhaps therefore not surprising that Sweden's only curling high school is located here. The high school started at 1989 and has since contributed several talented curlers to the world.

Härnösand also has an ice hockey team AIK Hockey Härnösand that plays in division 1 in region norr.

Recreation
Härnösand is a fairly small town and some of the activities young people engage in are Kåken, a youth centre provided by the municipality. The city also has an extensive selection of outdoor activities in the summer and wintertime. Wintertime people can go skiing (cross country and downhill), ice skating, etc. Summertime activities include climbing, kayaking, trekking, etc. The town also features a summertime beach Smitingen, which occasionally gets some surfable waves. Härnösand is each summer the site of one of the world's largest airsoft events, Berget.

Climate 
Härnösand has a humid continental climate (Dfb) with significant maritime influence, causing mild to warm summers and cold but not severe winters that are milder than areas further north. In the Kvarken area and further north the water is less salty and freezes easier, creating colder winter climate.

Notable natives 

Alfhild Agrell, writer and playwright
Anders Jonas Ångström, physicist
Albert Atterberg, soil mechanics
Bo Holmberg, politician
Carl Gustaf Nordin, statesman
Ulf Sandström, Ice Hockey player
Nils Bohlin, inventor 
Anette Norberg, women's curling Olympic gold medalist
Lubbe Nordström, writer/poet
Frideborg Winblad, educator and administrator
Lena Endre, Actor
Lasse Lindh, Musician
Håkan Ekström, Forestry Consultant
Monica Sjöö, (December 31, 1938 – August 8, 2005), Swedish painter, writer and a radical anarcho/ eco-feminist and an exponent of the Goddess movement.
Tomas Fischer, book publisher and businessman
Anton Forsberg, ice hockey goaltender for the Ottawa Senators

References

External links

 Härnösand official site
 Webcams 

Härnösand 
County seats in Sweden
Coastal cities and towns in Sweden
Populated places in Härnösand Municipality
Ångermanland
Municipal seats of Västernorrland County
Swedish municipal seats
Diocese of Härnösand
Cities in Västernorrland County